The 2020–21 Moldovan Women Top League was the 21st season of the highest women's football league in Moldova. The competition started on 27 September 2020 and ended on 6 June 2021.

Teams

Format
The 8 teams will play a round-robin tournament whereby each team plays each other twice, once at home and once away. Thus, a total of 56 matches will be played, with 14 matches played by each team.

League table

Results

References

External links
Women Top League - Moldova - Results, fixtures, tables - FMF

Moldovan Women Top League 2020-21
Moldovan Women Top League seasons
Moldova